The Eyes of Tammy Faye is a 2000 American documentary film about the life of Tammy Faye Bakker. Directed by Fenton Bailey and Randy Barbato, produced by their company World of Wonder, it is narrated by RuPaul Charles.

Legacy and home media
It was followed by a 2005 documentary Tammy Faye: Death Defying, which follows Bakker's struggle with inoperable stage 4 colon cancer. Both films are available on WOW Presents Plus.

Reception
The Eyes of Tammy Faye has a Rotten Tomatoes score of 86% based on 36 reviews. It is listed at 23rd on the 50 Documentaries to See Before You Die on Current TV.

Accolades
It won the Boston Society of Film Critics Award for Best Documentary Film and was also nominated for Independent Spirit Award for Best Documentary Feature.

Film adaptation
The documentary served as the basis for a biographical film of the same title, starring Jessica Chastain as Tammy Faye and Andrew Garfield as Jim, with Cherry Jones and Vincent D'Onofrio co-starring. Released in September 2021 to critical acclaim, Chastain won the Best Actress at the 94th Academy Awards.

References

External links
 
 The Eyes of Tammy Fay at World of Wonder
 

2000 films
2000 documentary films
2000 independent films
2000 LGBT-related films
American documentary films
American independent films
American LGBT-related films
Documentary films about Christianity in the United States
Documentary films about television people
Documentary films about women
Films about evangelicalism
Films directed by Randy Barbato
Films directed by Fenton Bailey
Films shot in California
Films shot in Minnesota
Films shot in Missouri
Films shot in North Carolina
Lionsgate films
World of Wonder (company) films
2000s English-language films
2000s American films